Kurt Pinkall (born 25 June 1955) is a retired German football forward.

References

External links
 

1955 births
Living people
German footballers
Bundesliga players
2. Bundesliga players
FC Viktoria Köln players
VfL Bochum players
Borussia Mönchengladbach players
Germany B international footballers
Association football forwards